The Dunkirk Evening Observer is a newspaper serving Dunkirk in Chautauqua County, New York. It serves the Western New York region. It has been a daily newspaper since at least the early 1900s; at that time there were five newspapers published in Dunkirk.

References

External links

Daily newspapers published in New York (state)